Asura thomensis is a moth species of the family Erebidae. It is found on São Tomé Island.

References

thomensis
Moths described in 1913
Moths of São Tomé and Príncipe
Fauna of São Tomé Island
Taxa named by Walter Rothschild